Wacky Races is an American animated television series produced by Hanna-Barbera Productions for CBS on Saturday mornings. The series features 11 different cars racing against each other in various road rallies throughout North America, with all of the drivers hoping to win the title of the "World's Wackiest Racer". The show was inspired by the 1965 comedy film The Great Race.

The cartoon had many regular characters, with 23 people and animals spread among the 11 race cars. Wacky Races ran Saturday mornings on CBS from September 14, 1968, to January 4, 1969, and in syndication from 1976 to 1982. Seventeen 20-minute episodes were produced, with each of them featuring two 10-minute segments.

The series spawned numerous spin-offs throughout the years featuring Dick Dastardly, the most similar in theme being "Fender Bender 500" in 1990.

In 2017, the series was remade as a reboot, airing on Boomerang. It aired only once on Cartoon Network on August 13, 2018.

Plot 
The cartoon revolves around several racers with various themes who are each allowed to use strange gimmicks to compete against other racers in many races across the United States.

The racers consist of:
 The Slag Brothers, Rock and Gravel, in a caveman-themed race car called the Boulder Mobile (1); their car is made out of rock and the brothers (who talk in caveman-like gibberish but with occasional intelligible words) power it up by hitting it on both sides with their clubs and are also able to re-build it from bare rock, always using their clubs.
 The Gruesome Twosome, Tiny "Big Gruesome" and Bela "Little Gruesome", who are monsters, in the Creepy Coupe (2); their horror-themed car includes a small bell tower inhabited by a fire-breathing dragon, bats and other creatures. The Creepy Coupe's special booster is "dragon power," with the dragon acting as a RATO unit.
 Professor Pat Pending, an inventor, in the Convert-a-Car (3); he can transform his car into pretty much anything that moves.
 The Red Max, a Manfred von Richthofen-styled aviator who speaks with a German accent, in a car/airplane hybrid called the Crimson Haybaler (4); his vehicle is able to fly, although only for short distances in ground effect.
 Penelope Pitstop, the lone female driver, in a 1930s racing costume in the Compact Pussycat (5); a Southern belle, Penelope seems more concerned with her looks than with racing and often gets herself into trouble. Nevertheless, she is a skilled racer.
 Sergeant Blast and Private Meekly in an armored car/tank hybrid called the Army Surplus Special (6); the Sergeant uses "fire power" (i.e. shooting cannonballs from his turret) to temporarily boost power in the car.
 The Ant Hill Mob, a group of dwarf-like gangsters led by Clyde and is composed of him, Ring-A-Ding, Rug Bug Benny, Mac, Danny, Kirby and Willy, in the Bulletproof Bomb (7); they are sometimes preoccupied with getting caught by the police and are able to use "getaway power", which involves all the gangsters (except for Clyde) extending their legs through the bottom of the car and running.
 Lazy Luke, a hillbilly, and Blubber Bear, a timid, cry-baby bear, in the Arkansas Chuggabug (8); Luke maneuvers the steering wheel with his bare feet and his car is steam-powered from an old rickety boiler. Luke has been known to blow up a balloon and use it as an air jet for briefly increased speed.
 Peter Perfect, a gentlemanly racer, in the Turbo Terrific (9); Peter is extremely strong, but also very vain, and he often boasts about the virtues of his high-tech race car – which regularly falls to pieces seconds after he praises it. He is fond of Penelope and often helps her out.
 Rufus Ruffcut, a lumberjack, and his companion Sawtooth, a beaver, in the Buzz Wagon (10); their car, entirely made of wood, features four circular saw blades as wheels and Sawtooth is able to cut through obstacles (such as trees and other objects) at super-high speed.
 Dick Dastardly, an archetypal mustache-twirling villain and his wheezily snickering dog, Muttley, in the Mean Machine (00); their sinister vehicle is a purple, rocket-powered car with an abundance of concealed weapons and the ability to fly. Dastardly's usual race strategy revolves around using the Mean Machine's great speed to get ahead of the other racers and then setting a trap to stop them and maintain the lead, but most of his plans backfire, causing him to fall back into last place. As a result, Dastardly is the only racer who not only never wins, but never even finishes in the top three in any race. In the opening title sequence, Dastardly attempts to stall the racers by chaining their cars to a pole, but then he accidentally shifts his car into reverse, bumps into and breaks the pole and frees the others as the race begins.

Production 
One of the unused plans for the series was that the races would be part of a live-action game show produced by Heatter-Quigley Productions (known for The Hollywood Squares), in which contestants would bet on which Wacky Racer would cross the finish line first. Although the game show concept was scrapped, the series was still produced by Hanna-Barbera Productions, in association with Heatter-Quigley Productions.

In 1988, a made-for-TV movie, Around the World with the Wacky Racers, was planned as part of Hanna-Barbera's Superstars 10 series of TV movies, but never got past the concept stage.

It has been said  that the feature film The Great Race (1965) was an influence towards three characters in this series: Peter Perfect (after Leslie Gallant III, played by Tony Curtis), Penelope Pitstop (after Maggie Dubois, played by Natalie Wood), and Dick Dastardly (after Professor Fate, played by Jack Lemmon).

Cast 
 Dave Willock as Narrator
 Paul Winchell as Dick Dastardly, Clyde, Private Meekly
 Don Messick as Muttley, Professor Pat Pending, Gravel Slag, Bella Gruesome, Ring-a-Ding, Sawtooth
 Daws Butler as Rock Slag, Tiny Gruesome, Red Max, Sergeant Blast, Peter Perfect, Rufus Ruffcut
 John Stephenson as Lazy Luke, Blubber Bear
 Janet Waldo as Penelope Pitstop

Episodes

Race results 
The show gave the results of each race at the end of each episode (the first, second, and third placings are given by the narrator, and the narrative sometimes saw some or all of the other cars cross the finish line) as well as what happened with Dick Dastardly after his last scheme's failure. The show never indicated a particular scoring system or way to determine who won the Wacky Races as a whole. The cumulative totals for first-, second-, and third-place finishes for each contestant are presented below:

Standings

Spin-offs and similar series 
Penelope Pitstop and the Ant Hill Mob were spun off into another cartoon series in 1969 titled The Perils of Penelope Pitstop. In the same year, Dick Dastardly and Muttley were given a spin-off series titled Dastardly and Muttley in Their Flying Machines. The series is sometimes mistakenly known as Stop the Pigeon, after the show's working title and theme song. Both series ran for a season each.

In 1977, Captain Caveman and the Teen Angels was produced. The titular Captain Caveman was modeled after the Slag Brothers.

In 1990, a cartoon segment in Wake, Rattle and Roll named Fender Bender 500 was produced. The show follows the same premise as Wacky Races, taking place on a World Tour instead of in the United States. Only Dick Dastardly was retained from the original cast; all the other racers are from other Hanna-Barbera shows such as "Yogi Bear" and "Augie Doggie and Doggie Daddy".

In 2006, the pilot for a spin-off series titled Wacky Races Forever was produced for Cartoon Network. The series depicted a roster of both new and returning racers competing against each other. Penelope Pitstop and Peter Perfect had married and created Perfect Industries, the corporate sponsor of the new Wacky Races, whereas their children Parker and Piper competed in the race. Other characters included the Slag Brothers, Professor Pat Pending (depicted here with a mad scientist personality), a teenage version of the Gruesome Twosome, and Dick Dastardly and Muttley (working for a new villain named Mr. Viceroy, who sought to steal Perfect Industries). The series was not picked up by Cartoon Network.

In 2016, DC Comics launched a comic series called Wacky Raceland. It was a dark and gritty reimagining of the series set after the Apocalypse in a similar vein to the Mad Max franchise. The comic ran for six issues from May to December 2016.

A reboot—also produced by Hanna-Barbera—was released on Boomerang's SVOD service in 2017. It also aired on the Boomerang channels around the world starting later in the year.

On June 15, 2022, it was announced a stop-motion Wacky Races series is in production and will air on Cartoon Network. The series will be produced by Hanna-Barbera Studios Europe.

Films

Hanna-Barbera cinematic universe

Scoob! (2020)

Dick Dastardly (voiced by Jason Isaacs) and Muttley (voiced by Billy West and archived laugh recordings Don Messick) made an appearance as the main villains in the animated Scooby-Doo feature film, Scoob!, released on May 15, 2020. Rock and Gravel Slag made cameo appearances during the prehistoric gladiator scene. Various drawings of the Wacky Racers cameo on Dick Dastardly's prison cell on the wall during the credits. Penelope Pitstop was to appear physically as a main character interacting with Scooby and Shaggy according to concept art but she instead makes a brief cameo on a video game cabinet themed around her.

In 2018, an animated film based on Wacky Races was reported to be in development by Warner Animation Group.

Video games 
The main plot of Wacky Races, in which characters racing on unusual fictional vehicles and using various over-the-top "weapons" to hinder their opponents, would later go on to inspire the kart racing video game genre in the 1990s,. Wacky Races eventually has its own video game series since 1991, preceding Nintendo's Super Mario Kart, which was considered as the foremost game of this kind. Various video games based on the series have been produced.
 Wacky Races (1991)
 Wacky Races (2000)
 Wacky Races: Starring Dastardly and Muttley
 Wacky Races: Mad Motors
 Wacky Races: Crash and Dash

In 1993, Sega released a medal game based on the series, exclusively in Japan. It was a racing game, but the outcome of the race depended entirely on luck. The PS2 game Wacky Races: Starring Dastardly and Muttley is notable for allowing players to have Dick Dastardly finally win a race. The narrator is taken aback or disgusted and Dastardly is happy and surprised at winning a race. In 2007, Heiwa released a pachinko game titled Kenken Aloha de Hawaii. Later in 2007, another game called Wacky Races: Mad Motors for the PlayStation 2 was released by Blast Entertainment on June 12. A new video game for the Wii and Nintendo DS consoles titled Wacky Races: Crash and Dash was released on June 27, 2008. This game was developed by Eidos. In 2009, another arcade game was released by Banpresto, which was a more traditional racing game. It ran on the Taito Type X2, and was released internationally by Gamewax.

Home video
A three-disc DVD release of the complete series was made available in Japan on August 10, 2001, and had both English and Japanese audio. In Great Britain, Warner released a three-disc set with no extra features, which was only available in Virgin Megastores. The complete box set of Wacky Races was released on July 31, 2006, as an HMV exclusive but is essentially the standard Volumes 1–3 with no extras. The Australian release of Volume 1 and 2 was made available in 2005 and Volume 3 released in 2007.

Warner Home Video released the entire series, with commentaries and other extras, in a DVD box set on October 19, 2004.

A two-and-a-half-hour VHS video was made available in 1996.

All 34 episodes can be purchased on the iTunes Store.

On February 14, 2017, Warner Archive re-released Wacky Races: The Complete Series on DVD in region 1 as part of their Hanna-Barbera Classics Collection as a Manufacture-on-Demand (MOD) release.

The cars and characters in other media 
Life-size working replicas of the vehicles have been built in the U.K. (where the show was very popular) and appear annually at the Goodwood Festival of Speed, with new additions each year. 2008 saw the last of the cars (the Ant Hill Mob in the Bulletproof Bomb #7) added to the collection, making a complete set.

The Digimon Frontier episode "Trailmon vs. Trailmon" paid tribute to the show.

In 2006, the car manufacturer Vauxhall launched a television commercial for the British market, parodying Wacky Races with a similar setup featuring Corsa cars. The commercial made several references to the cartoon as well as utilizing the show's theme music and Muttley's iconic snicker.

The English adult comic Viz had a one-off parody strip called "Wacky Racists" with David Irving as Dick Dastardly, Unity Mitford as Penelope Pitstop, Eugène Terre'Blanche as Lazy Luke, Oswald Mosley as Muttley, and comedian Bernard Manning in the "Fatcuntmobile".

In 2013, the car manufacturer Peugeot launched a TV commercial for the Brazilian market (and later used in Spain and Turkey), featuring the cartoon characters in a real-life universe.

Wacky Races was also seen in the South Park episode "Handicar".

Dick Dastardly and Muttley made a cameo in the Uncle Grandpa episode "Uncle Grandpa Retires".

The Buzz Wagon appeared in the OK K.O.! Let's Be Heroes episode "Crossover Nexus".

Dick Dastardly, Muttley, and Penelope Pitstop appear in Space Jam: A New Legacy as part of the spectators of the big game, and Penelope is the Compact Pussycat the whole time. Muttley also appears in his Scoob! form.

The Army Surplus Special appeared in the Jellystone! episode "My Doggie Dave".

See also 
 List of works produced by Hanna-Barbera Productions
 List of Hanna-Barbera characters

References

External links 

 It's the Wacky Races!
 
 Cartoon Network: DOC – Wacky Races – cached copy from Internet Archives
 The Cartoon Scrapbook – Profile on Wacky Races
 Wacky Races on Flickr
 Bulletproof Bomb #7 Replica at Greenwood Races
 Arkansas Chugabug #8 Replica at Greenwood Races
 The Buzz WAgon # 10 Replica at Greenwood races

1960s American animated television series
1960s American comedy television series
1968 American television series debuts
1969 American television series endings
American children's animated comedy television series
American children's animated fantasy television series
American children's animated sports television series
Animated television series about dogs
Animated television series about auto racing
Appaloosa Interactive games
Automotive television series
CBS original programming
English-language television shows
Television shows adapted into comics
Television shows adapted into video games
Television series by Hanna-Barbera
Television series by Heatter-Quigley Productions
Wacky Races
Prehistoric people in popular culture
Television series about cavemen